Nodular vasculitis is a skin condition characterized by crops of small, tender, erythematous nodules on the legs, mostly on the calves and shins. Miroscopically there are epithelioid granulomas and vasculitis in the subcutaneous tissue, making it a form of panicullitis. Most of these cases are now thought to be manifestation of tuberculosis and indeed they respond well to anti-tuberculous treatment.

See also 
 Panniculitis
 List of cutaneous conditions

References

External links 

Conditions of the subcutaneous fat